Chambersburg is an unincorporated community in Columbiana County, in the U.S. state of Ohio.

History
Chambersburg was platted in 1828. A variant name was New Crambersburg(h). A post office called New Chambersburgh was established in 1846, the spelling was changed to New Chambersburg in 1894, and the post office closed in 1904.

References

Unincorporated communities in Columbiana County, Ohio
1828 establishments in Ohio
Populated places established in 1828
Unincorporated communities in Ohio